Premjeet Singh "Prem" Dhillon is an Indian singer and lyricist associated with Punjabi music. He started his singing career in 2018 with single "Chan Milondi". Dhillon is best known for singles "Boot Cut","Old Skool" and "Majha Block

Music career 
Dhillon was born in Amritsar village Daula Nangal and started his music career with the single "Chan Milondi", which was released in March 2018. Later, his "Patt Tenu" from Mr & Mrs 420 Returns was released in August 2018. In 2019, his single "Positive Jatt" was released. In September 2019, he finally got his breakthrough with single "Boot Cut", released by Sidhu Moose Wala. As of October 2020, the song has been viewed over 37 million times on YouTube. In January 2020, his single "Old Skool" was released, which featured Moose Wala and Naseeb in it. The song was viewed over a million times within hours of its release on YouTube, and peaked at number 16 in Apple Music India daily charts. The song was ranked at number 52 in Global, 23 in India, 6 in Australia, in Canada, and 2 in New Zealand on YouTube music charts. On the BBC's Asian music chart, the song entered top 20, and became Dhillon's first song to reach the chart. In April 2020, he released the single "Jatt Hunde Aa", which debuted at number 38 on Apple Music chart in India. Its music video was released in June 2020.

Discography

Extended plays

Singles discography 
Lyrics of the songs are written by Prem Dhillon unless otherwise noted.

Film soundtracks

References

External links 
 

1995 births
Living people
Punjabi singers
Punjabi-language singers